The British-Brazilian Treaty of 1826 was a treaty between the United Kingdom and the Empire of Brazil, by which Brazil agreed to ban the African slave trade.

It was signed at Rio de Janeiro on 23 November 1826. Exchange of ratifications took place on 13 March 1827, and the Parliament of the United Kingdom passed legislation on 2 July 1827 to enforce the treaty (Slave Trade, Convention with Brazil Act 1827, 7 & 8 Geo. 4 c. 74).

In 1827, Emperor Pedro I presented the treaty to the Chamber of Deputies for its approval; its Committee for Diplomacy and Statistics approved the convention by three votes to two. In response, on 2 July 1827, deputy Raimundo José da Cunha Mattos, a member of the Committee who opposed the treaty, delivered a two hour speech in defence of the continuation of the slave trade. 

The treaty provided that it would be illegal for any subject of the Empire of Brazil to be engaged in carrying out the African slave trade. It provided a three year grace period after the exchange of ratifications, which meant that the ban took effect on 13 March 1830.

The United Kingdom had mediated the Treaty of Rio de Janeiro (1825) by which Portugal recognised the independence of Brazil; the UK had made a commitment from Brazil to abolish the slave trade a condition of its support in securing recognition of Brazil's independence, and this treaty was agreed in fulfilment of that commitment.

Although the treaty was supported by Emperor Pedro I, it did not have widespread popular support in Brazil; as a result, the Brazilian government largely failed to enforce the treaty, and the slave trade to Brazil continued despite the treaty's ban. In response, the Parliament of the United Kingdom passed the Aberdeen Act of 1845, which authorised British warships to board Brazilian ships and seize any found to be involved in the slave trade.

External links
Full text of the treaty (English and Portuguese)

References

1826 in Brazil
1826 in the British Empire
1826 treaties
Treaties of the Empire of Brazil
Treaties of the United Kingdom (1801–1922)
African slave trade
Slavery in Brazil
Anti-slavery treaties
Brazil–United Kingdom relations